The soundtrack to Harry Potter and the Philosopher's Stone (titled Harry Potter and the Sorcerer's Stone in the United States) was released on 30 October 2001. The film's score was composed and conducted by John Williams.  The soundtrack was nominated for Best Original Score at the 74th Academy Awards. The film introduces many character-specific themes (leitmotifs) that are used in at least one sequel as well, although most of the themes are only used again in Chamber of Secrets. These themes include two themes for Voldemort, two themes for Hogwarts, a Diagon Alley theme, a Quidditch theme, a flying theme, two friendship themes, and the main theme ("Hedwig's Theme").  This main theme was reprised and developed in all eight of the main Harry Potter films, as well as the spinoff films Fantastic Beasts and Where to Find Them and its sequels, Fantastic Beasts: The Crimes of Grindelwald and Fantastic Beasts: The Secrets of Dumbledore.

The soundtrack was certified gold in Canada (50,000 units) by the Canadian Recording Industry Association on 14 December 2001. It was also certified gold in Japan for 100,000 units by the RIAJ. In 2002, the soundtrack was nominated for Best Original Score at the 74th Academy Awards in which Williams took part in conducting the ceremony. However, Williams lost to Howard Shore's score of The Lord of the Rings: The Fellowship of the Ring.

The score was performed by the London Session Orchestra at Air Lyndhurst Studios and Abbey Road Studios in London with orchestrations provided by Williams, Alexander Courage, Conrad Pope, John Neufeld, Eddie Karam, Pete Anthony, Benjamin Wallfisch and Larry Rench. It entered the Billboard 200 at  48 and also charted at  2 on the Top Soundtracks Chart. In UK, the album charted at number 19. In 2018, the soundtrack was released by La-La-Land Records as a 3-Disc CD set encompassing the complete score of the film as part of a limited edition box set featuring the scores for the first three Harry Potter films.

Track listing

Original Release

Harry Potter - The John Williams Soundtrack Collection: Disc 1

Harry Potter - The John Williams Soundtrack Collection: Disc 2

Harry Potter - The John Williams Soundtrack Collection: Disc 3

Critical reception 
Critical reactions to the soundtrack were almost universally positive, praising the score's central themes. However, some critics felt that the score lacked originality and repeated its themes excessively.

Behind the scenes

James Horner was approached to compose the score for the film but he turned it down. "Hedwig's Theme" is the leitmotif for the film series. Often labelled as the series's main theme, it first appeared in Harry Potter and the Philosopher's Stone in the track "Prologue". A concert arrangement of the same name is included in the end credits. "Hedwig's Theme" has been interpolated in the fourth through eighth Harry Potter film scores, including in those by Patrick Doyle, Nicholas Hooper, and Alexandre Desplat and the spin-off Fantastic Beasts scores by James Newton Howard. It also appears in the scores to the last four Harry Potter video games, all composed by James Hannigan. "Hedwig's Theme" has achieved significant pop culture status, being featured as ring tones, trailer music, and other forms of multimedia.

Track  10 concludes with "A Change of Season," although in the film, the season's change had occurred before the Norwegian Ridgeback had hatched.

Track  18 is also included in the epilogue of Harry Potter and the Deathly Hallows – Part 2 as a tribute to Williams and the series' end.

Certifications

References

01
Harry Potter 1
2001 soundtrack albums
2000s film soundtrack albums
Albums with cover art by Drew Struzan
Nonesuch Records soundtracks
Atlantic Records soundtracks
Warner Records soundtracks
La-La Land Records soundtracks
Fantasy film soundtracks